Matmata may refer to:

Places 
Matmata, Tunisia, a town in Tunisia
Matmata, Morocco, a town in Morocco

Other uses 
 Matmatah, French rock band
 Matmata Berber, Tunisian dialect